The Man in the Raincoat  is a French-Italian comedy-thriller film directed by Julien Duvivier, scripted by the director and René Barjavel, from the 1954 novel Tiger by the Tail by James Hadley Chase. It was released in 1957 and shown at the 7th Berlin International Film Festival in competition for the Golden Bear. It stars Fernandel, (with whom Duvivier had made two successful Don Camillo films earlier in the 1950s), and Bernard Blier.

Plot
The wife of Albert Constantin  goes to visit her uncle, who is sick. Albert, (Fernandel), a clarinet player with the orchestra of the Théâtre du Châtelet finds himself alone for a week. Albert finds it hard to cope, being domestically inept, and his colleague in the orchestra, Émile, (Jean Rigaux), recommends he go to see Éva (Judith Magre). He, himself, sees her from time to time. At first hesitant, Albert goes to see the woman.

So much the worse for Albert. Éva is murdered, while he waits to see her in her living-room. Realising Éva is a prostitute he hurries away, only to read the next day of a murder and reports of a man running away, in a raincoat, from the scene of the crime.  He soon finds himself dealing with a blackmailer, a neighbour of the murdered woman, Monsieur Raphaël (Bernard Blier), and professional killers.  And so Albert is overtaken by a series of events that plunge him ever  deeper into troubles.

Cast
Fernandel as Albert Constantin, clarinetist
Bernard Blier as Monsieur Raphaël
Jacques Duby as Maurice Langlois
Jean Rigaux as Émile Blondeau
Claude Sylvain as Florence
Judith Magre as Éva
John McGiver as O'Brien
Julien Bertheau as the director

References

External links

1950s comedy thriller films
1957 films
French black-and-white films
Films based on British novels
Films based on works by James Hadley Chase
Films directed by Julien Duvivier
Films with screenplays by René Barjavel
1950s French-language films
French comedy thriller films
Italian comedy thriller films
1957 comedy films
Italian black-and-white films
1950s French films
1950s Italian films